The Nez Perce (Nee-Me-Poo) National Historic Trail follows the route taken by a large group of the Nez Perce tribe in 1877 to avoid being forced onto a reservation. The 1,170-mile (1,883 km) trail was created in 1986 as part of the National Trails System Act and is managed by the U.S. Forest Service. The trail traverses through portions of the U.S. states of Oregon, Idaho, Wyoming, and Montana and connects sites across these states that commemorate significant events of the Nez Perce War that took place between June and October 1877, as several bands of the Nez Perce tried to escape capture by the U.S. Cavalry. The sites are among the 38 that are part of the National Park service's Nez Perce National Historical Park, managed over all by the National Park Service, with some sites managed by local and state affiliated organizations.

History

A band of 750 Nez Perce warriors and women, children and elders made the journey. They were parties to the 1855 Treaty of Walla Walla with the U.S. Government, but in 1877 were being forced to give up more land in violation of the treaty.  They fought numerous engagements with the 7th Cavalry.  Their maneuvers evolved as their objectives changed. First, they were fleeing some episodes of violence that erupted during their initial relocation to a smaller reservation; next, trying to evade the 7th cavalry and reach a territory of the US where they could continue their traditional lifestyle; finally, trying to escape to Canada.

Beginning near Wallowa Lake in eastern Oregon, the Nez Perce headed east into Idaho. After the Battle of White Bird Canyon they crossed Lolo Pass into Montana and fought a major battle at what is now known as Big Hole National Battlefield. After that, the Nez Perce continued traveling south and east, back into Idaho and then into Wyoming entering Yellowstone National Park near West Yellowstone, Montana. The tribe left the park crossing Sylvan Pass and followed the Clarks Fork River back into Montana. From there the Nez Perce headed almost straight north for Canada and almost made it. The Nez Perce were near starvation and exhaustion after fighting their last battle north of the Bear Paw Mountains, less than 40 miles (64 km) from the Canada–US border, when they surrendered to U.S. authorities. Chief Joseph is widely credited with leading the Nez Perce on this journey. He served as a camp supervisor and guardian, who was entrusted with handling the logistics of camp and travel, and taking care of the women and children.

At the time of the surrender, Chief Joseph was the most prominent surviving leader among the group; he decided it was time to surrender. A few members of the tribe did reach Canada, but the vast majority were relocated to Kansas and Oklahoma for eight years before being allowed to relocate to the reservation in Idaho, nearer their ancestral home.

Trail description

The trail passes through numerous National Park Service managed areas, National Forests, and Bureau of Land Management Public Lands. While Oregon was already a state, the other three states the trail now passes through were still territories. None of the forest lands were managed by the federal government, but Yellowstone National Park was created 5 years before the Nez Perce journey. The trail also passes through privately owned property and it is best advised to obtain permission to enter these areas from local landowners. Little of the trail is actually a foot trail although much of the journey can be closely followed by roads. Attempts are underway to continue to preserve right of way to allow greater access for visitors.

See also 
 Nez Perce National Historical Park

References

External links 

 Nez Perce National Historic Trail map
 
 Nez Perce Trail Foundation

Nez Perce tribe
National Historic Trails of the United States
Historic districts in Montana
Hiking trails in Oregon
Hiking trails in Idaho
Hiking trails in Montana
Federal lands in Montana
1986 establishments in Montana
Units of the National Landscape Conservation System